Andrey Igorevich Smolyakov (born 24 November 1958) is a Soviet and Russian actor and director. He is known for Vysotskiy. Spasibo, chto zhivoy (2011), Stalingrad, and Forbidden Empire.

Life
Smolyakov was born in Podolsk, Moscow Oblast, Russian SFSR, Soviet Union as Andrey Igorevich Smolyakov. For three years he studied at Boris Shchukin Theatre Institute, but switched. In 1980 he graduated from the State Institute of Theatre Arts in a workshop under supervision of Oleg Tabakov.  After graduation, he started working as actor on the stage of the Moscow Art Theatre. In 1984-1986 he was associated with the theater "Satirikon".  In 1987 he joined the Moscow Studio Theatre Oleg Tabakov.

In 2004 he remarried to fashion designer Daria Razumikhina.

Career
Smolyakov made his debut in the film Kiss Dawns (1977).

He played the title role in the playwright "Farewell, Mowgli!" based on The Jungle Book by Rudyard Kipling.

In 2000 he received the prize of the newspaper Moskovskij Komsomolets in the category "Best Actor" for his role as actor in the play The Lower Depths by Maxim Gorky.

In 2002 Andrey Smolyakov, received an award from the Stanislavsky International Fund as well as an award from the Moscow Expert Jury for his role as Brucson in Der Theatermacher, a playwright by Thomas Bernhard.

At the awards ceremony at Mosfilm Andrey Smolyakov was the winner of the Golden Eagle Award (Russia) for the best supporting actor in Vysotsky. Thank You For Being Alive as Viktor Bekhteev, a KGB Colonel in Uzbekistan, a drama film about Vladimir Vysotsky.

The Russian series Grigorii R, directed by Andrey Malyukov, began on Russian TV Monday 27 October 2014; with Vladimir Mashkov as Grigori Rasputin and Smolyakov as the investigator Smitten.

Selected filmography
 Father Sergius (1978) as Alyosha
 Dawns Are Kissing (1978)
 Confrontation (1985) as the real Grigoriy Milinko
 Stalingrad (1989) - Leonid Khrushchev
 Hello, Fools! (1996) - Volodya, bodyguard
 Still Waters (2000) - Ivan Pavlovich, Kashtanov's assistant
 Daddy (2004) - Odintsov
 Children of the Arbat (2004) - Nikolai Yezhov
 Adjutants of Love (2005) - Charles Maurice de Talleyrand-Périgord
 Konservy (2007) - Petr Rodionov, FSB Colonel
 Vysotsky. Thank You For Being Alive (2011) - Viktor Bekhteev, KGB Colonel in Uzbekistan
 Fairytale.Is (2011) - Evil Clown
 Stalingrad (2013) - Polyakov, sergeant artillery
 Viy (2014) - priest Paisiy
 Star (2014)
 Viking (2016) - Rogvolod
 Raid (2017) - Police officer Andrey Ryzhov
 Going Vertical (2017)
 Coach (2017) - father of Stoleshnikov
 The Factory (2018)
 Dead Lake (2019) - oligarch
 More volnuetsya raz (2021) - Old man
 Mira (2022) - Fomin

References

External links

1958 births
Living people
People from Podolsk
Russian male film actors
Russian male television actors
Russian male stage actors
Soviet male actors
20th-century Russian male actors
21st-century Russian male actors
People's Artists of Russia
State Prize of the Russian Federation laureates
Russian Academy of Theatre Arts alumni